Djuice (short for digital juice) is a youth based mobile phone plan from Telenor. It is currently available in Montenegro and Pakistan. Djuice was available in Sweden, Norway, Malaysia, New Zealand, Thailand, Ukraine, Hungary and Bangladesh. According to its website Djuice has close to 12 million subscribers around the world, thus making it the second largest youth based operator in the world.

History 

Djuice was launched in Norway and Hungary in 2003, Ukraine in 2004, Bangladesh in 2005, Pakistan in 2006 and Montenegro in 2008.

In October 2006, Djuice was launched by Telenor Group of Pakistan. It was the second largest network in Pakistan.

Djuice was launched in Bangladesh by Grameenphone on 14 April 2005 i.e. the Bengali New Year. On 14 April 2007 Djuice Bangladesh shed its old skin to put up its new identity which a part of the worldwide re-branding process of Djuice. Djuice Bangladesh has a talent hunt show called dRockstars which searches the country for a rock band.

In 2012, the brand Djuice was merged with Telenor and all the balances of the Djuice customers accounts were confiscated by Telenor, which led to a number of dissatisfied customers. In October 2013, Ukrainian mobile operator Kyivstar stopped offering mobile plans under the brand name "Djuice", citing the need to unify all of its brands.

References 

Mobile telecommunication services
Telenor